2015 in film is an overview of events, including the highest-grossing films, award ceremonies, festivals, and a list of films released and notable deaths.

Evaluation of the year
Richard Brody of The New Yorker described 2015 as, "one of Hollywood's worst years" but also stated that it was also "a terrific year for movies over all". He emphasized that, "The anticipated Oscarizables have mainly ranged from the blandly enjoyable to the droningly disastrous. Partly, the problem is merely one of scheduling: most of Hollywood's inspired directors, the ones whose images have a natural musical sublimity and complexity, weren't on call this year. My list reflects the unfortunate accident of a calendar year with no release by many of the best American directors working in or out of the Hollywood system, such as Martin Scorsese, Sofia Coppola, Wes Anderson, Miranda July, Terrence Malick, James Gray, David Fincher, Steven Soderbergh, and Paul Thomas Anderson."

Highest-grossing films 

The top 10 films released in 2015 by worldwide gross are as follows:

Star Wars: The Force Awakens grossed over $2 billion, the third film to surpass that milestone, and the third highest-grossing film of all time. Jurassic World, Furious 7, Avengers: Age of Ultron, and Minions have each grossed over $1 billion, making them among the highest-grossing films of all time. Spectre and Inside Out grossed more than $850 million.

Minions became the first non-Disney animated film and the third animated film overall after Toy Story 3 (2010) and Frozen (2013) to gross over $1 billion, and is currently the fifth highest-grossing animated film of all time.

2015 notable box office records

Studio records 
2015 is the first year that a single studio (Universal Pictures) released three films that each grossed over $1 billion, the first year that a single studio released two films that both grossed over $1.5 billion, and the first year that a single studio released two films that both grossed over $1 billion outside of North America.
 Universal also generated $2 billion and $3 billion in a single year at the international box office faster than any studio before, doing so on June 10, June 14, and July 17, 2015, respectively. The previous records was held by 20th Century Fox when it reached $2 and $3 billion on June 15 and July 30, 2010, respectively. Universal previously grossed $2 billion in 2013, reaching the milestone on September 17 of that year. Furthermore, the studio also broke the record for fastest studio to generate $1 billion in the United States and Canada (on June 14, 2015), beating the previous record ascendance achieved by Paramount Pictures on June 22, 2008, and $2 billion (on August 16, 2015), beating the previous speed record of December 25, 2009 held by Warner Bros., and the fastest to $3, $4, and $5 billion worldwide (It achieved the $5 billion milestone on July 17, 2015, breaking the record previously held by Fox near the end of November 2014). Universal is also the first studio to achieve $6 billion at the global box office in one year.
 Walt Disney Studios became the first studio to release three films within a single franchise — the Marvel Cinematic Universe (MCU) — that each grossed over $1 billion, with Avengers: Age of Ultron joining 2012's The Avengers and 2013's Iron Man 3. The MCU also became the highest-grossing film franchise with the release of Avengers: Age of Ultron, surpassing the Harry Potter film franchise ($7.723 billion, 2001–2011), and becoming the first franchise to gross over $8 billion. With the subsequent release of Ant-Man, the MCU also became the first franchise to gross over $9 billion.

Film records 
 Furious 7 became the fastest film to reach $1 billion in ticket sales worldwide, doing so in 17 days; this record was later surpassed by Universal's own Jurassic World two months later, accruing the same amount in 13 days; this record was in turn surpassed six months later by Star Wars: The Force Awakens, which accrued $1 billion in 12 days. Furious 7 also became the first American film ever to gross over ¥2 billion (amassing ¥2.426 billion) at the Chinese box office.
 Jurassic World grossed $524.4 million worldwide in its opening weekend, making it the highest-grossing worldwide opening of all time, surpassing Harry Potter and the Deathly Hallows – Part 2 ($483.2 million in 2011). Jurassic World also grossed $208.8 million in North America in its opening weekend, beating the previous record held by The Avengers ($207.4 million in 2012). Both records were later surpassed by Star Wars: The Force Awakens in the same year. It also became the highest-grossing film that was not the highest-grossing film of its year, surpassing Iron Man 3.
 Terminator Genisys became the first American film to earn $400 million worldwide without also grossing $100 million in North America. The only other production to hit that threshold before was the French film The Intouchables (2012).
 Minions became the fastest animated film to $1 billion in 49 days, surpassing Toy Story 3 (75 days). It also becomes the first Non-Disney animated film to gross over $1 billion, and is the highest-grossing spinoff film, as well as the highest-grossing prequel.
 Star Wars: The Force Awakens broke all pre-sale ticket records and grossed $529 million in its opening weekend, making it the highest-grossing worldwide opening of all time, surpassing Jurassic World ($524.4 million on 12–14 June 2015). The Force Awakens also grossed $248 million in North America in its opening weekend, beating the previous record held by Jurassic World ($208.8 million). The film subsequently became the first to exceed $800 million in the domestic box office on January 9 and $900 million on February 5. It also became Disney's first film to gross over $1 billion at the foreign box office, as well as the third film to ever gross over $2 billion worldwide. This makes it the third highest-grossing film of all time.
 2015 is tied with 2018 for the greatest number of films to gross more than $1 billion with five, surpassing 2012's record of four, but later was surpassed in 2019 to have nine films with that milestone. It has also set the record for the greatest number of films crossing the $1.5 billion mark with three.

Events

Award ceremonies

Festivals

Awards

2015 films 
The list of films released in 2015, arranged by country, are as follows:
 List of American films of 2015
 List of Argentine films of 2015
 List of Australian films of 2015
 List of Bangladeshi films of 2015
 List of Brazilian films of 2015
 List of British films of 2015
 List of Chinese films of 2015
 List of French films of 2015
 List of Hong Kong films of 2015
 List of Indian films of 2015
 List of Assamese films of 2015
 List of Bengali films of 2015
 List of Bollywood films of 2015
 List of Punjabi films of 2015
 List of Gujarati films of 2015
 List of Kannada films of 2015
 List of Malayalam films of 2015
 List of Marathi films of 2015
 List of Tamil films of 2015
 List of Telugu films of 2015
 List of Tulu films of 2015
 List of Indonesian films
 List of Italian films of 2015
 List of Japanese films of 2015
 List of Mexican films of 2015
 List of Pakistani films of 2015
 List of Russian films of 2015
 List of South Korean films of 2015
 List of Spanish films of 2015
 List of Turkish films of 2015

Deaths

References 

 
Film by year